The Arrow 250 is a family of single-cylinder, two-stroke, single- or dual-ignition aircraft engines that were designed for ultralight aircraft by Arrow SNC of Italy.

The Arrow family of engines are modular in design and share the same pistons, cylinders and gearboxes assembled around different crankcase designs, giving one-, two- or four-cylinder engines. Arrow engines are no longer in production.

Development
The 250 is a conventional single-cylinder engine that weighs only . The engine features single- or optional dual-ignition, reed valve induction, free air cooling, tuned exhaust system, a slide venturi-type Bing carburetor, fuel pump, Nikasil cylinder coatings. The engine was offered with a gearbox reduction system that included a one-way clutch. Starting is electric starter with no provision for a recoil starter.

The tuned exhaust supplied with the engine has been criticized as "cumbersome" and needing modification to fit most aircraft.

Variants
250
Gasoline aircraft engine, . Out of production.
270 AC
Gasoline aircraft engine,  at 6800 rpm, weight  with carburetor, alternator, fuel pump and starter. Out of production.

Specifications (Arrow 250)

See also

References

Arrow SNC engines
Air-cooled aircraft piston engines
Two-stroke aircraft piston engines